Lough Fee is a freshwater lake in the west of Ireland. It is located in the Connemara area of County Galway.

Geography

Hydrology
The Tooreenacoona River enters Lough Fee at its southwestern shore. Lough Fee flows out to the northwest to Lough Muck, which in turn flows to the Atlantic Ocean via the Culfin River.

Natural history
Fish species in Lough Fee include salmon and brown trout. Lough Fee is part of The Twelve Bens/Garraun Complex Special Area of Conservation.

See also
List of loughs in Ireland

References

External links 
 

Fee